Cophomantella alphanozoma is a moth in the family Lecithoceridae. It was described by Edward Meyrick in 1926. It is known from Sierra Leone and Uganda.

The wingspan is 15–16 mm. The forewings are dark purplish-slaty fuscous with undefined slightly oblique fasciae of blackish suffusion about one-third and two-thirds, disappearing in oblique lights, the second followed by an ochreous-whitish spot on the costa at three-fourths. The hindwings are rather dark grey.

References

Moths described in 1926
Cophomantella
Taxa named by Edward Meyrick